The Mayor of Wellington is the head of the municipal government of the City of Wellington. The mayor presides over the Wellington City Council. The mayor is directly elected using the Single Transferable Vote method of proportional representation. The current mayor is Tory Whanau, elected in October 2022 for a three-year-term.

Whanau, a member of the Green Party who ran as an independent, won the 2022 Wellington mayoral election in a landslide. She will be inaugurated within the same month. Whanau is the first indigenous person, and therefore the first Māori woman, to ascend to the Wellington mayoralty.

History
The development of local government in Wellington was erratic. The first attempt to establish governmental institutions, the so-called "Wellington Republic", was short-lived and based on rules written by the New Zealand Company. Colonel William Wakefield was to be the first president.

When the self-proclaimed government arrested a ship's captain for a violation of Wellington law, the Governor William Hobson quickly asserted British sovereignty over the whole of New Zealand, sending a warship and contingent of soldiers to Wellington Harbour and disbanding the council through a show of force.

In January 1842, the Legislative Council in Auckland passed the Municipal Corporations Ordinance, and in May 1842 Wellington was officially proclaimed a borough, the first municipality with this status. The office of mayor was established, but there were only two holders of this office under the Ordinance. George Hunter received the most votes in the election for 12 Burgesses to the new council on 3 October 1842 and was declared mayor. He died suddenly on 19 July 1843. William Guyton was then declared mayor, as runner-up in 1842.

The British Government disallowed the Municipal Corporations Ordinance, but news of this did not reach Wellington until late September 1843, after the election had been held and a second Burgess Roll of qualified voters had been prepared, in 1843 (both Rolls are listed in Carman 1970). After a brief period of little local government, the Province of Wellington was established in 1852, and most of Wellington's affairs were handled by the provincial government.

In 1863, a Town Board was established with three wards (Thorndon, Lambton, Te Aro), but no Mayor.

On 16 September 1870, Wellington was officially incorporated as a city, and a new mayoralty created, which continues to be in place. The establishment of the new council was primarily driven by John Plimmer, called by some the Father of Wellington. Initially, the councillors elected one of their own as mayor towards the end of the year. The role was traditionally awarded to the longest serving councillor. The system changed upon the introduction of The Municipal Corporations Acts Amendment Act, 1875. It legislated that mayors must be elected at large by eligible voters. The inaugural mayoral election was held in 1874 resulting in William Sefton Moorhouse being the first mayor to be elected directly by voters.

Since then the office of mayor has been held by 37 people. Five people have been mayor on two separate occasions, and the longest-serving mayor was Sir Frank Kitts, from 1956 to 1974. Tory Whanau, elected in 2022, is the first Māori person to serve as mayor.

List of mayors of Wellington
Key

List of deputy-mayors of Wellington
Key

Timeline

Notes

References
Wellington: Biography of a City by Redmer Yska (2006, Reed Books, Auckland) 
Betts on Wellington: A City and its Politics by G. M. Betts (1970, Reed, Wellington) 
The Birth of a City: Wellington 1840–1843 by A. H. Carman (1970, Wright & Carman, Wellington)
No Mean City by Stuart Perry (1969 booklet, Wellington City Council) includes a paragraph and a portrait or photo of each mayor, including Hunter & Guyton.

External links
Mayors of Wellington (with photos, from Wellington City Archives)

 
Wellington, New Zealand
1842 establishments in New Zealand